Svitlana Mayboroda (born 1981) is a Ukrainian mathematician who works as a professor of mathematics at the University of Minnesota.

Research
Mayboroda's research concerns harmonic analysis and partial differential equations, including boundary value problems for elliptic partial differential equations. Her work has provided a new mathematical approach to Anderson localization, a phenomenon in physics in which waves are confined to a local region rather than propagating throughout a medium, and with this explanation she can predict the regions in which waves will be confined.

Education and career
Mayboroda was born on June 2, 1981 in Kharkiv. She earned the Ukrainian equivalent of two master's degrees, one in finance and one in applied mathematics, from the University of Kharkiv in 2001, and completed her Ph.D. in 2005 from the University of Missouri under the supervision of Marius Mitrea. After visiting positions at the Australian National University, Ohio State University, and Brown University, she joined the Purdue University faculty in 2008, and moved to the University of Minnesota in 2011.

Recognition
Mayboroda was a Sloan Research Fellow for 2010–2015.
In 2013, she became the inaugural winner of the Sadosky Research Prize in Analysis of the Association for Women in Mathematics.
In 2015 she was elected as a fellow of the American Mathematical Society. In 2016, she was awarded the first Northrop Professorship at the University of Minnesota.
She is an invited speaker at the 2018 International Congress of Mathematicians, speaking in the section on Analysis and Operator Algebras.

References

External links
Home page

1981 births
Living people
Ukrainian mathematicians
Ukrainian women mathematicians
21st-century American mathematicians
American women mathematicians
National University of Kharkiv alumni
Fellows of the American Mathematical Society
Sloan Research Fellows
PDE theorists
21st-century women mathematicians
University of Minnesota faculty
Purdue University faculty
University of Missouri mathematicians
University of Missouri alumni
21st-century American women